Krisztián Zahorecz (28 October 1975 – 21 December 2019) was a Hungarian football player. He was born in Szarvas.

References

Player profile at HLSZ 

1975 births
2019 deaths
People from Szarvas
Hungarian footballers
Association football defenders
Kaposvári Rákóczi FC players
Place of death missing
Nagykanizsai SC footballers
Debreceni VSC players
Egri FC players
Szolnoki MÁV FC footballers
Kecskeméti TE players
Sportspeople from Békés County